Larry Stuart may refer to:

 Enzo Stuarti (1919–2005), Italian American tenor and musical theater performer, who used the stage name Larry Stuart
 Larry Stuart (athlete) (1937–2015), American track and field athlete

See also
Larry Stewart (disambiguation)